This is the list of Greek exonyms for the places in Turkey.

Çanakkale Province: Çanakkale ili (Greek: νομός Δαρδανέλλιων nomós Dardanélliōn; Katharevousa: νομὸς Δαρδανέλλιων nomòs Dardanélliōn).

 Bozcaada district: Bozcaada ilçesi (Greek: επαρχία Τενέδου eparchía Tenédou; Katharevousa: ἐπαρχία Τενέδου eparkhía Tenédou).
 Bozcaada
 during Ancient, Roman and Byzantine era (until 1354): Tenedos (Ancient Greek: Τένεδος Ténedos; Latin: Tenedvs).
 until 1922: Tenedos (Greek: and Katharevousa: Τένεδος Ténedos )
 Eceabat district: Eceabat ilçesi (Greek: επαρχία Μαδύτου eparchía Madýtou; Katharevousa: ἐπαρχία Μαδύτου eparkhía Madútou).
 Alçıtepe:
 until 1922: Krithia (Greek: Κριθιά Krithiá; Katharevousa: Κριθιὰ Krithià).
 Apostor:
 until 1922: Agioi Apostoloi (Greek: Άγιοι Απόστολοι Ágioi Apóstoloi; Katharevousa: Ἄγιοι Απόστολοι Hágioi Apóstoloi). Nowadays ruined
 Hrisostomı:
 until 1922: Chrisostomos (Greek: Χρυσόστομος Chrysóstomos; Katharevousa: Χρυσόστομος Khrusóstomos). Nowadays ruined
 Vergı:
 until 1922: Vergi (Greek: Βέργη Vérgī; Katharevousa: Βέργη Bérgē). Nowadays ruined
 Bahçeköy
 during Ottoman age (1354–1920): Bakse-kioi (Greek: Βακσέ-κιοϊ Baksé-kioï; Katharevousa: Βακσὲ-κιοϊ Baksè-kioï)
 during Greek administration (1920–1922): Kipochori (Greek: Κηποχώρι Kīpochṓri; Katharevousa: Κηποχώριον Kēpokhṓrion)
 Behramlı
 during Ancient, Roman and Byzantine era (until 1354): Helikon (Ancient Greek: Ἔλικων Élikōn; Latin: Helicvm) during Ottoman age (1354–1920): Virchanli (Greek: Βιρχανλή Virchanlī́; Katharevousa: Βιρχανλῆ Birkhanlē̂)
 during Greek administration (1920–1922): Charmoni (Greek: Χαρμονή Charmonī́; Katharevousa: Χαρμονὴ Kharmonḕ)
 Aleksı:
 until 1922: Agios Alexios (Greek: Άγιος Αλέξιος Ágios Aléxios; Katharevousa: Ἄγιος Αλέξιος Hágios Aléksios). Nowadays ruined
 Beşyol
 during Ottoman age (1354–1920): Toursoun (Greek: Τουρσούν Toursoún; Katharevousa: Τουρσοὺν Toursoùn)
 during Greek administration (1920–1922): Melissa (Greek and Katharevousa: Μέλισσα Mélissa)
 Bigalı
 during Ottoman age (1354–1920): Mpigali (Greek: Μπιγαλή Mpigalī́; Katharevousa: Μπιγαλῆ Mpigalē̂)
 during Greek administration (1920–1922): Sigali (Greek: Σιγαλή Sigalī́; Katharevousa: Σιγαλὴ Sigalḕ)
 Büyükanafarta
 during Byzantine era (until 1354): Anobathra (Ancient Greek: Ἀνοβάθρα Anobáthra; Latin: Anobathra).
 until 1922: Megali Anafertos (Greek: Μεγάλη Ανάφερτος Megalī Anáfertos; Katharevousa: Μεγάλη Ἀνάφερτος Megálē Anáphertos)
 Eceabat
 during Roman and Byzantine age (until 1354): Madytos (Ancient Greek: Μάδυτος Mádutos; Latin: Madytvs).
 until 1922: Ma(d)ytos (Greek: Μά(δ)υτος Má(d)ytos ; Katharevousa: Μά(δ)υτος Má(d)utos)
 Keçili
 during Ottoman age (1354–1920): Kitseli (Greek: Κιτσελή Kitselī́; Katharevousa: Κιτσελῆ Kitselē̂)
 during Greek administration (1920–1922): Kissini (Greek: Κισσίνη Kissínī; Katharevousa: Κισσίνη Kissínē)
 Kilitbahir
 during Ancient, Roman and Byzantine era (until 1354): Kynos Sema (Ancient Greek: Κυνὸς Σῆμα  Kunòs Sē̂ma; Latin: Cynossema) during Ottoman age (1354–1920): Kilit-mpachr (Greek: Κιλίτ-μπάχρ Kilít-mpáchr; Katharevousa: Κιλὶτ-μπὰχρ Kilìt-mpàkhr)
 during Greek administration (1920–1922): Elli (Greek: Έλλη Éllī; Katharevousa: Ἕλλη Héllē) or Kynos Sima (Greek: Κυνός Σήμα  Kynós Sī́ma; Katharevousa: Κυνὸς Σῆμα  Kunòs Sē̂ma )
 Kocadere
 during Ottoman age (1354–1920): Kotsa-Dere (Greek: Κοτςά-Δερέ Kotsá-Deré; Katharevousa: Κοτςὰ-Δερὲ Kotsà-Derè)
 during Greek administration (1920–1922): Kylla (Greek: Κύλλα Kýlla; Katharevousa: Κύλλα Kúlla)
 Kumköy
 during Ottoman age (1354–1920): Koum-kioi (Greek and Katharevousa: Κούμ-κιοϊ Koúm-kioï)
 during Greek administration (1920–1922): Koulia (Greek: and Katharevousa: Κούλια Koúlia)
 Küçükanafarta
 during Byzantine era (until 1354): Anobathra (Ancient Greek: Ἀνοβάθρα Anobáthra; Latin: Anobathra).
 until 1922: Mikra Anafertos (Greek: Μικρά Ανάφερτος Mikrá Anáfertos; Katharevousa: Μικρὰ Ἀνάφερτος Mikrà Anáphertos)
 Seddülbahir
 during Ancient, Roman and Byzantine era (until 1354): Elaious (Ancient Greek: Ἐλαιοῦς Elaioū̂s; Latin: Elævs) during Ottoman age (1354–1920): Elaious (Greek: Ελαιούς Elaioús; Katharevousa: Ἐλαιοῦς Elaioū̂s) or Sent-il-mpachr (Greek: Σέντ -ίλ-μπάχρ Sént-íl-mpáchr; Katharevousa: Σὲντ-ἴλ-μπὰχρ Sènt-íl-mpàkhr)
 during Greek administration (1920–1922): Elaious (Greek: Ελαιούς Elaioús; Katharevousa: Ἐλαιοῦς Elaioū̂s)
 Ertuğrul
 during Greek administration (1920–1922): Akrotiri (Greek: Ακρωτήρι Akrōtī́ri; Katharevousa: Ἀκρωτῆρι Akrōtē̂re) or Greko (Greek and Katharevousa: Γρέκο Gréko)
 Tekke
 during Ottoman administration (1354–1920) Teke (Greek: Τεκέ Teké; Katharevousa: Τεκὲ Tekè)
 during Greek administration (1920–1922): Teues (Greek: Τευές Tefés; Katharevousa: Τευὲς Teuès)
 Yalova
 during Ancient, Roman and Byzantine era (until 1354): Sestos (Ancient Greek: Σηστὸς Sēstōs; Latin: Sestvs) during Ottoman age (1354–1920): Gialova (Greek and Katharevousa: Γιάλοβα Giálova)
 during Greek administration (1920–1922): Sistos (Greek: Σηστὸς Sīstōs; Katharevousa: Σηστὸς Sēstōs)
 Yolağzı:
 until 1922: Silvia (Greek: Σίλβια Sílvia; Katharevousa: Σίλβια Sílbia).
 Gelibolu district: Gelibolu ilçesi (Greek: επαρχία Καλλιπόλεως eparchía Kallipóleōs; Katharevousa: ἐπαρχία Καλλιπόλεως eparkhía Kallipóleōs).
 Bayırköy
 during Ottoman age (1354–1920): Mpairi (Greek: Μπαΐρι Mpaḯri; Katharevousa: Μπαΐριον Mpaḯrion)
 during Greek administration (1920–1922): Vairi (Greek: Βαΐρι Baḯri; Katharevousa: Βαΐριον Baḯrion)
 Bayramiç
 during Ottoman age (1354–1920): Mpairamitsi(o) (Greek: Μπαϊραμίτσι(ο) Mpaïramítsi(o); Katharevousa: Μπαϊραμίτσιον  Mpaïramítsion)
 during Greek administration (1920–1922): Paschalia (Greek: Πασχαλιά Paschaliá Katharevousa: Πασχαλιὰ Paskhalià)
 Bolayır
 during Ancient, Roman and Byzantine era (until 1354): Kardia (Ancient Greek: Καρδία Kardía; Latin: Cardia) during Ottoman age (1354–1920): Mpolair (Greek: Μπολαΐρ Mpolaḯr; Katharevousa: Μπολαῒρ Mpolaï̀r) or Plagiari (Greek: Πλαγιάρι  Plagiári; Katharevousa: Πλαγιάρου Plagiárou)
 during Greek administration (1920–1922): Kardia (Greek and Katharevousa: Καρδία Kardía)
 Burhanlı
 during Ottoman age (1354–1920): Vourchanli (Greek: Βουρχανλή Vourchanlī́; Katharevousa: Βουρχανλῆ Bourkhanlē̂)
 during Greek administration (1920–1922): Vrochili (Greek: Βροχηνή Vrochīlī́; Katharevousa: Βροχηνὴ Brokhēlḕ)
 Cevizli
 during Ottoman age (1354–1920): Dzevizli (Greek: Δζεβιζλή Dzevizlī́; Katharevousa: Δζεβιζλῆ Dzebizlē̂)
 during Greek administration (1920–1922): Karisos (Greek: Κάρησος Kárisos; Katharevousa: Κάρησος Kárēsos)
 Cumalı
 during Ottoman age (1354–1920): Dzoumanli (Greek: Δζουμαλή Dzoumalī́; Katharevousa: Δζουμαλῆ Dzoumanlē̂)
 during Greek administration (1920–1922): Paraskevi (Greek: Παρασκευή Paraskevī́; Katharevousa: Παρασκευὴ Paraskeuḕ)
 Çimpe
 during Ottoman age (1362-1920) Tzympin (Greek: Τζύμπην Tzýmpīn; Katharevousa: Τζὺμπην Tzúmpēn)
 Çokal
 during Ottoman age (1354–1920): Tsokali (Greek: Τσοκαλή Tsokalī́; Katharevousa: Τσοκαλῆ Tsokalē̂)
 during Greek administration (1920–1922): Sikalis (Greek and Katharevousa: Σίκαλις Síkalis)
 Değirmendüzü
 during Ottoman age (1354–1920): Pergazi(o) (Greek: Περγάζι(ο) Pergázi(o); Katharevousa: Περγάζιον  Pergázion)
 during Greek administration (1920–1922): Pyrgio (Greek: Πύργιο Pýrgio Katharevousa: Πύργιον Púrgion)
 Evreşe
 during Ancient, Roman and Byzantine era (until 1354): Afrodisia (Ancient Greek: Ἀφροδισία Aphrodisía; Latin: Aphrodisia) during Ottoman age (1354–1920): Evres (Greek: Έβρες Évres; Katharevousa: Ἔβρες Ébres) or Kadi-kioi (Greek: Καδή-κιοϊ Kadī́-kioï; Katharevousa: Καδῆ-κιοϊ Kadē̂-kioï)
 during Greek administration (1920–1922): Afrodisia (Greek: Αφροδισία Afrodisía; Katharevousa: Ἀφροδισία Aphrodisía) or Evres (Greek: Έβρες Évres; Katharevousa: Ἔβρες Ébres)
 Fındıklı
 during Ottoman age (1354–1920): Angelochori (Greek: Αγγελ(λ)οχώρι Angel(l)ochṓri; Katharevousa: Ἀγγελ(λ)οχώριον Angel(l)okhṓrion) or Seitan-kioi (Greek: Σεϊτάν-κιοϊ  Seïtán-kioï; Katharevousa: Σεϊτὰν-κιοϊ Seïtàn-kioï)
 during Greek administration (1920–1922): Angelochori (Greek: Αγγελ(λ)οχώρι Angel(l)ochṓri; Katharevousa: Ἀγγελ(λ)οχώριον Angel(l)okhṓrion)
 Gelibolu
 during Ancient, Roman and Byzantine era (until 1354): Kallipolis (Ancient Greek: Καλλίπολης Kallípolis; Latin: Callipolis).
 until 1922: Kallipolis (Greek and Katharevousa: Καλλίπολης Kallípolis )
 Ilgardere
 during Ottoman age (1354–1920): Ourgkar-Dere (Greek: Ουργκάρ-Δερέ Ourgkár-Deré; Katharevousa: Οὐργκὰρ-Δερὲ Ourgkàr-Derè)
 during Greek administration (1920–1922): Dravos (Greek: Δράβος Drávos; Katharevousa: Δράβος Drábos)
 Kalealtı
 during Ottoman age (1354–1920): Kale-Alti (Greek: Καλέ-Αλτή  Kalé-Altī́; Katharevousa: Καλὲ-Ἀλτῆ Kalè-Altē̂)
 during Greek administration (1920–1922): Alki (Greek: Άλκη Álkī; Katharevousa: Ἄλκη Álkē)
 Karainebeyli
 during Ottoman age (1354–1920): Karna-Mveili (Greek: Καρνά-Μβεϊλή Karná-Mveïlī́; Katharevousa: Καρνᾶ-Μβεϊλῆ Karnā̂-Mbeïlē̂) or Sagos (Greek: and Katharevousa: Σάγος Ságos)
 during Greek administration (1920–1922): Kaliros (Greek: Κάληρος Kálīros; Katharevousa: Κάληρος Kálēros)
 Kavakköy
 during Ottoman age (1354–1920): Kavak (Greek: Καβάκ Kavák; Katharevousa: Καβὰκ Kabàk)
 during Greek administration (1920–1922): Leuki (Greek: Λευκή  Lefkī́; Katharevousa: Λευκὴ  Leukḕ)
 Kavaklı
 during Ottoman age (1354–1920): Kavakli (Greek: Καβακλή Kavaklī́; Katharevousa: Καβακλῆ Kabaklē̂)
 during Greek administration (1920–1922): Chalyvi (Greek: Χαλύβη Chalývī́; Katharevousa: Χαλύβη Khalúbē)
 Ortaköy
 during Ancient and Roman era:  Lysimachia (Ancient Greek: Λυσιμάχ(ε)ια Lusimákh(e)ia; Latin: Lysimachia).
 until 1922: Examili (Greek: Εξαμίλι Examíli; Katharevousa: Ἑξαμίλιον Eksamilion)
 Pazarlı
 during Ottoman age (1354–1920): Pazarli (Greek: Παζαρλή Pazarlī́; Katharevousa: Παζαρλῆ Pazarlē̂)
 during Greek administration (1920–1922): Anaplos (Greek: Άναπλος Ánaplos; Katharevousa: Ἄναπλος Ánaplos)
 Süleymaniye
 during Ottoman age (1354–1920): Souleimanie (Greek: Σουλεϊμανιέ Souleïmanié; Katharevousa: Σουλεϊμανιὲ Souleïmaniè)
 during Greek administration (1920–1922): Ekklisochori (Greek: Εκκλησοχώρι Ekklīsochṓri; Katharevousa: Ἐκκλησοχώριον Ekklēsochṓrion)
 Sütlüce
 during Ancient, Roman and Byzantine era (until 1354): Aigos Potamoi (Ancient Greek: Αιγὸς Ποταμοὶ Aigòs Potamoì; Latin: Ægospotami) during Ottoman age (1354–1920): Galata(s) (Greek: Γαλατά(ς) Galatá(s); Katharevousa: Γαλατᾶς Galatā̂(s))
 during Greek administration (1920–1922): Aigos Potamoi (Greek: Αιγός Ποταμοί Aigós Potamoí; Katharevousa: Αιγὸς Ποταμοὶ Aigòs Potamoì)
 Şadıllı
 during Ottoman age (1354–1920): Santili (Greek: Σαντιλή Santilī́; Katharevousa: Σαντιλῆ Santilē̂)
 during Greek administration (1920–1922): Sandali (Greek: Σανδάλη Sandálī; Katharevousa: Σανδάλη Sandálē)
 Tayfurköy:
 until 1922: Tayfiri (Greek: Ταϋφίρι Taüphíri; Katharevousa: Ταϋφύριον Taüphírion) or Tayfyri (Greek: Ταϋφύρι Taüphýri; Katharevousa: Ταϋφύριον Taüphúrion).
 Yeniköy
 during Ottoman age (1354–1920): Geni-kioi (Greek: Γενή-κιοϊ Genī́-kioï; Katharevousa: Γενῆ-κιοϊ  Genē̂-kioï)
 during Greek administration (1920–1922): Neochori (Greek: Νεοχώρι Neochṓri ; Katharevousa: Νεοχώριον Neokhṓrion)

Edirne Province: Edirne ili (Greek: νομός Αδριανοπόλεως nomós Adrianopóleōs; Katharevousa: νομὸς Ἀδριανοπόλεως nomòs Adrianopóleōs).

 Edirne district: merkez ilçesi (Greek: επαρχία Αδριανοπόλεως eparchía Adrianopóleōs; Katharevousa: ἐπαρχία Ἀδριανοπόλεως, eparchía Adrianopóleōs).
 Ahi
 during Ottoman age (1361–1920): Achi(r)-kioi (Greek: Αχή(ρ)-κιοϊ Achī́r-kioï; Katharevousa: Ἀχῆ(ρ)-κιοϊ Akhē̂r-kioï)
 during Greek administration (1920–1922): Agra (Greek: Άγρα Ágra; Katharevousa: Ἄγρα Ágra)
 Arnavutköy
 during Ottoman age (1361–1920): Arnaout-kioi (Greek and Katharevousa: Ἀρναούτ-κιοϊ Arnaoút-kioï)
 during Greek administration (1920–1922): Kaloneri (Greek and Katharevousa: Καλονέρι Kalonéri). Nowadays ruined
 Avarız
 during Ottoman age (1361–1920): Chavaris (Tsiflik) (Greek: Χάβαρις (Τσιφλίκ) Chávaris (Tsiflík); Katharevousa: Χάβαρις (Τσιφλὶκ) Khábaris (Tsiphlìk))
 during Greek administration (1920–1922): Chavaris (Greek: Χάβαρις Chávaris; Katharevousa: Χάβαρις Khábaris)
 Bosna
 during Ottoman age (1361–1920): Mposna (Greek and Katharevousa: Μπόσνα Mpósna), Mposnakioi (Greek and Katharevousa: Μποσνάκιοϊ Mposnákioï) or Mposn(i)ochori (Greek: Μποσν(ι)οχώρι Mposn(i)ochṓri; Katharevousa: Μποσν(ι)οχῶρι Mposn(i)okhō̂ri)
 during Greek administration (1920–1922): Bosn(i)ochori (Greek: Βοσν(ι)οχώρι Bosn(i)ochṓri; Katharevousa: Βοσν(ι)οχῶρι Bosn(i)okhō̂ri), Visa (Greek: Βίσα Vísa; Katharevousa: Βίσα Bísa) or Vyssa (Greek: Βύσσα Výssa; Katharevousa: Βύσσα Bússa)
 Balat
 during Roman and Byzantine era (...-1361) Palation (Ancient Greek: Παλάτιον Palátion; Latin: Palativm) during Ottoman age (1361–1920): Mpalat (Greek and Katharevousa: Μπαλάτ Mpalát)
 during Greek administration (1920–1922): Palati (Greek: Παλάτι Paláti; Katharevousa: Παλάτιον Palátion) or Pedias Palatiou (Greek and Katharevousa: Πεδιάς Παλατιού Pediás Palatioú). Nowadays ruined
 Muhtrar
 during Ottoman age (1361–1920): Michtrer (Greek: Μιχρέρ Michtrér; Katharevousa: Μιχρέρ Mikhtrér)
 during Greek administration (1920–1922): Megali Pedias (Greek: Μεγάλη Πεδιάς Megálī Pediás; Katharevousa: Μεγάλη Πεδιάς Megálē Pediás). Nowadays ruined
 Budakdoğanca
 during Ottoman age (1361–1920): (Mpountak-)Dougantzia (Greek and Katharevousa: (Μπουντάκ-)Δουγάντζια (Mpounták-)Dougántzia)
 during Greek administration (1920–1922): Gerani (Greek: Γεράνη Geránī; Katharevousa: Γεράνη Geránē)
 Büyükdöllük
 during Ottoman age (1361–1920): Vougiouk-Doliouk (Greek: Βουγιούκ-Δολιούκ Vougioúk-Dolioúk; Katharevousa: Βουγιοὺκ-Δολιοὺκ Bougioùk-Dolioùk)
 during Greek administration (1920–1922): Megali Genea (Greek: Μεγάλη Γενεά Megálī Geneá; Katharevousa: Μεγάλη Γενεὰ Megálē Geneà)
 Büyükismailce
 during Ottoman age (1361–1920): Mpegiouk-Ismailtze (Greek: Μπεγιούκ-Ἰσμαήλτζε Mpegioúk-Ismaī́ltze; Katharevousa: Μπεγιοὺκ-Ἰσμαῆλτζε Mpegioùk-Ismaē̂ltze)
 during Greek administration (1920–1922): Smilitsa (Greek and Katharevousa: Σμιλίτσα Smilítsa)
 Değirmenyanı
 during Ottoman age (1361–1920): Dermen-Geni-kioi (Greek: Δερμέν-Γενή-κιοϊ Dermén-Genī́-kioï; Katharevousa: Δερμὲν-Γενῆ-κιοϊ Dermèn-Genḕ-kioï)
 during Greek administration (1920–1922): Myloi (Greek: Μύλοι Mýloi; Katharevousa: Μύλοι Múloi)
 Demirhanlı
 during Ottoman age (1361–1920): Demirchanli (Greek: Δεμιρχανλή Demirchanlī́; Katharevousa: Δεμιρχανλῆ Demirkhanlē̂)
 during Greek administration (1920–1922): Sidirokastro (Greek: Σιδηρόκαστρο Sidīrókastro;Katharevousa: Σιδηρόκαστρον Sidērókastron)
 Doyran
 during Ottoman age (1361–1920): Doiran (Greek: Δοϊράν Doïrán; Katharevousa: Δοϊρὰν Doïràn)
 during Greek administration (1920–1922): Doirani (Greek: Δοϊράνη Doïranī;Katharevousa: Δοϊράνη Doïránē)
 Edirne
 during Ancient era:  Orestias (Ancient Greek: Ὀρεστιὰς Orestiàs; Latin: Orestias). during Roman and Byzantine era (...-1361) Hadrianopolis (Ancient Greek: Ἀδριανούπολις Hadrianoúpolis; Latin: Hadrianopolis).
 until 1922: Adrianopoli (Greek: Αδριανούπολη Adrianoúpolī  or Αντριανούπολη Antrianoúpolī; Katharevousa: Ἀδριανούπολις Hadrianoúpolis)
 Ekmekçi
 during Ottoman age (1361–1920): Ekmektse-kioi (Greek: Εκμεκτσή-κιοϊ Ekmektsī́-kioï; Katharevousa: Ἐκμεκτσῆ-κιοϊ Ekmektsē̂-kioï)
 during Greek administration (1920–1922): Artoforo (Greek: Αρτοφόρο Artophóro;Katharevousa: Ἀρτοφόρον Artophóron)
 Elçili
 during Ottoman age (1361–1920): Eltsili (Greek: Ελτσιλή  Eltsilī́; Katharevousa: Ἐλτσιλῆ  Eltsilē̂)
 during Greek administration (1920–1922): Kirykas (Greek: Κήρυκας Kī́rykas;Katharevousa: Κήρυκας Kḗrukas)
 Eskiüyüklütatar
 during Ottoman age (1361–1920): Mpegiouk-Tatarkioi (Greek: Μπεγιούκ-Τατάρκιοϊ Mpegioúk-Tatárkioï; Katharevousa: Μπεγιοὺκ-Τατάρκιοϊ Mpegioùk-Tatárkioï)
 during Greek administration (1920–1922): Herakleion (Greek: Ηράκλειον Īrákleion;Katharevousa: Ἡράκλειον Īrákleion). Nowadays ruined
 Hacıumur
 during Ottoman age (1361–1920): Chatzi-Omar (Tsiflik) (Greek: Χατζή-Ομάρ (Τσιφλίκ) Chatzī́-Omár (Tsiflík); Katharevousa: Χατζῆ-Ὀμὰρ (Τσιφλὶκ) Khatzē̂-Omàr (Tsiflìk))
 during Greek administration (1920–1922): Tomaro (Greek: Τόμαρο Tómaro; Katharevousa: Τόμαρον Tómaron)
 Hasanağa
 during Ottoman age (1361–1920): Chasan-Aga (Greek: Χασάν-Αgά Chasán-Agá; Katharevousa: Χασὰν-Ἀgᾶ Khasàn-Agā̂)
 during Greek administration (1920–1922): Kallithea (Greek and Katharevousa: Καλλιθέα Kallithéa)
 Hatipköy
 during Ottoman age (1361–1920): Chatip-kioi (Greek: Χατίπ-κιοϊ Chatíp-kioï; Katharevousa: Χατίπ-κιοϊ Khatíp-kioï)
 during Greek administration (1920–1922): Xylokopos (Greek: Ξυλοκόπος Xylokópos; Katharevousa: Ξυλοκόπος Ksylokópos)
 Hıdırağa
 during Ottoman age (1361–1920): Chadir-Aga (Greek: Χαδήρ-Αγά Chadī́r-Agá; Katharevousa: Χαδὴρ-Ἀγᾶ Khadḕr-Agā̂)
 during Greek administration (1920–1922): Charauge (Greek: Χαραυγή Charaugī́; Katharevousa: Χαραυγὴ Kharaugḕ)
 İskender
 during Ottoman age (1361–1920): Iskenter-kioi (Greek: Ισκεντέρ-κιοϊ Iskentér-kioï; Katharevousa: Ἰσκεντέρ-κιοϊ Iskentér-kioï)
 during Greek administration (1920–1922): Alexandrochori (Greek: Αλεξανδροχώρι Alexandrochṓri; Katharevousa: Ἀλεξανδροχῶρι Aleksandrokhō̂ri)
 Karaağaç
 during Ottoman age (1361–1920): Kara-Agats (Greek: Καρά-Αγάτς Kará-Agáts; Katharevousa: Καρὰ-Ἀγὰτς Karà-Agàts)
 during Greek administration (1920–1922): Orestias (Greek: Ορεστιάς Orestiás; Katharevousa: Ὀρεστιὰς Orestiàs)
 Lalapaşa district: Lalapaşa ilçesi (Greek: επαρχία Δρογγυλίου eparchía Drongylíou; Katharevousa: ἐπαρχία Δρογγυλίου eparkhía Drongylíou).
 Büyüköğünlü
 during Ottoman age (1361–1920): Mpougiounlou (Greek: Μπουγιουνλού Mpougiounloú; Katharevousa: Μπουγιουνλοῦ Mpougiounloū̂)
 during Greek administration (1920–1922): Vistinos (Greek: Βίστιρος Vístinos; Katharevousa: Βίστιρος Bístinos)
 Çalıdere
 during Ottoman age (1361–1920): Tsiali-Dere (Greek: Τσιαλή-Δερέ Tsialī́-Deré; Katharevousa: Τσιαλῆ-Δερὲ Tsialē̂-Derè)
 during Greek administration (1920–1922): Vatorreyma (Greek: Βατόρρευμα Vatórrefma; Katharevousa: Βατόρρευμα Batórreyma)
 Çatma
 during Ottoman age (1361–1920): Tsiatma (Greek: Τσιατμά Tsiatmá; Katharevousa: Τσιατμᾶ Tsiatmā̂)
 during Greek administration (1920–1922): Skapani (Greek: Σκαπάνη Skapánī; Katharevousa: Σκαπάνη Skapánē)
 Çömlekakpınar
 during Ottoman age (1361–1920): Tsiomlek-Ak-Mpounar (Greek: Τσιομλέκ-Άκ-Μπουνάρ Tsiomlék-Ák-Mpounár; Katharevousa: Τσιομλὲκ-Ἄκ-Μπουνὰρ Tsiomlèk-Ák-Mpounàr)
 during Greek administration (1920–1922): Nerofolia (Greek: Νεροφωλιά Nerofōliá; Katharevousa: Νεροφωλιὰ Nerophōlià)
 Çömlekköy
 during Ottoman age (1361–1920): Tsiomlek-kioi (Greek and Katharevousa: Τσιομλέκ-κιοϊ Tsiomlék-kioï)
 during Greek administration (1920–1922): Chytrades (Greek: Χυτράδες Chytrádes; Katharevousa: Χυτράδες Khutrádes)
 Demirköy
 during Ottoman age (1361–1920): Demir-kioi (Greek and Katharevousa: Δεμίρ-κιοϊ Demír-kioï)
 during Greek administration (1920–1922): Siderio (Greek: Σιδέριο Sidério; Katharevousa: Σιδέριον Sidérion)
 Doğanköy
 during Ottoman age (1361–1920): Don-kioi (Greek and Katharevousa: Δόν-κιοϊ Dón-kioï)
 during Greek administration (1920–1922): Pagonia (Greek: Παγωνιά Pagōniá; Katharevousa: Παγωνιὰ Pagōnià)
 Dombay
 during Ottoman age (1361–1920): Dompan (Greek: Δομπάν Dompán; Katharevousa: Δομπὰν Dompàn)
 during Greek administration (1920–1922): Dompano (Greek: Δόμπανο Dómpano; Katharevousa: Δόμπανον Dómpanon)
 Hacıdanişment
 during Ottoman age (1361–1920): Chatzi-Danisman (Greek: Χατζή-Δανισμάν Chatzī́-Danismán; Katharevousa: Χατζῆ-Δανισμὰν Khatzē̂-Danismàn)
 during Greek administration (1920–1922): Tania (Greek and Katharevousa: Τανία Tanía)
 Hacılar
 during Ottoman age (1361–1920): Chatzilar (Greek: Χατζιλάρ Chatzilár; Katharevousa: Χατζιλὰρ Khatzilàr)
 during Greek administration (1920–1922): Proskynitario (Greek: Προσκυνητάριο Proskynītário; Katharevousa: Προσκυνητάριον Proskynētárion)
 Hamzabeyli
 during Ottoman age (1361–1920): Chachza-Veili (Greek: Χαχζά-Βεϊλή Chachzá-Veïlī́; Katharevousa: Χαχζᾶ-Βεϊλῆ Khakhzā̂-Beïlē̂)
 during Greek administration (1920–1922): Vigla (Greek: Βίγλα Vígla; Katharevousa: Βίγλα Bígla)
 Hanlıyenice
 during Ottoman age (1361–1920): Chanli-Genitze (Greek: Χανλή-Γενιτζέ Chanlī́-Genitzé; Katharevousa: Χανλῆ-Γενιτζὲ Khanlē̂-Genitzè)
 during Greek administration (1920–1922): Chania (Greek: Χανιά Chaniá; Katharevousa: Χανιὰ Khanià)
 Hüseyinpınar
 during Ottoman age (1361–1920): Chousein-Mpounar (Greek: Χουσεΐν-Μπουνάρ Chouseḯn-Mpounár; Katharevousa: Χουσεῒν-Μπουνὰρ Khouseï̀n-Mpounàr)
 during Greek administration (1920–1922): Anario (Greek: Ανάριο Anário; Katharevousa: Ἀνάριον Anárion)
 Kalkansöğüt
 during Ottoman age (1361–1920): Kalkan-Sogiout (Greek: Καλκάν-Σογιούτ Kalkán-Sogioút; Katharevousa: Καλκὰν-Σογιοὺτ Kalkàn-Sogioùt)
 during Greek administration (1920–1922): Aspida (Greek: Ασπίδα Aspída; Katharevousa: Ἀσπίδα Aspída)
 Kavaklı:
 until 1922: Kavakli (Greek: Καβακλή Kavaklī́; Katharevousa: Καβακλῆ Kabaklē̂).
 Küçüköğünlü
 during Ottoman age (1361–1920): Kiotsouklou (Greek: Κιουτσουκλού Kioutsougloú; Katharevousa: Κιουτσουκλοῦ Kioutsougloū̂)
 during Greek administration (1920–1922): Mikrolofos (Greek: Μικρόλοφος Mikrólofos; Katharevousa: Μικρόλοφος Mikrólophos)
 Lalapaşa
 during Ottoman age (1361–1920): Lala-Pasa (Greek: Λαλά-Πασά Lalá-Pasá; Katharevousa: Λαλᾶ-Πασᾶ Lalā̂-Pasā̂)
 during Greek administration (1920–1922): Drongylio (Greek: Δρογγύλιο Drongýlio; Katharevousa: Δρογγύλιον Drongýlion)
 Ortakçı
 during Ottoman age (1361–1920): Ortaktsi (Greek: Ορτακτσή Ortaktsī́; Katharevousa: Ὀρτακτσῆ Ortaktsē̂)
 during Greek administration (1920–1922): Mesochori (Greek: Μεσοχώρι Mesochṓri; Katharevousa: Μεσοχῶρι Mesokhō̂ri)
 Ömeroba
 during Ottoman age (1361–1920): Omerova (Greek: Ομέροβα Omérova; Katharevousa: Ὀμέροβα Oméroba)
 during Greek administration (1920–1922): Kefalari (Greek: Κεφαλάρι Kefalári; Katharevousa: Κεφαλάρι Kephalári)
 Saksağan
 during Ottoman age (1361–1920): Saxagan (Greek: Σαξαγάν Saxagán; Katharevousa: Σαξαγὰν Saksagàn)
 during Greek administration (1920–1922): Kissaros (Greek and Katharevousa: Κίσσαρος Kíssaros)
 Sarıdanişment
 during Ottoman age (1361–1920): Sari-Danisman (Greek: Σαρή-Δανισμάν Sarī́-Danismán; Katharevousa: Σαρῆ-Δανισμὰν Sarē̂-Danismàn)
 during Greek administration (1920–1922): Xanthino (Greek: Ξάνθινο Xánthino; Katharevousa: Ξάνθινον Ksánthinon)
 Sinanköy
 during Ottoman age (1361–1920): Pravadi (Greek: Πραβαδή Pravadī́; Katharevousa: Πραβαδῆ Prabadē̂)
 during Greek administration (1920–1922): Provatoteicho (Greek: Προβατότειχο Provatóteicho; Katharevousa: Προβατότειχον Probatóteikhon)
 Süleymandanişment
 during Ottoman age (1361–1920): Souleiman (Greek: Σουλεϊμάν Souleïmán; Katharevousa: Σουλεϊμὰν Souleïmàn)
 during Greek administration (1920–1922): Selinous (Greek: Σελινούς Selinoús;Katharevousa: Σελινοῦς Selinoū̂s)
 Taşlımüsellim
 during Ottoman age (1361–1920): Tasli-Mouselim (Greek: Τασλή-Μουσελήμ Taslī́-Mouselī́m; Katharevousa: Τασλῆ-Μουσελὴμ Taslē̂-Mouselḕm)
 during Greek administration (1920–1922): Petrochori (Greek: Πετροχώρι Petrochṓri; Katharevousa: Πετροχώριον Petrokhṓrion)
 Tuğlalık
 during Ottoman age (1361–1920): Touglalik (Greek: Τουγλαλήκ Touglalī́k; Katharevousa: Τουγλαλὴκ Touglalḕk)
 during Greek administration (1920–1922): Plinthio (Greek: Πλίνθιο Plínthio; Katharevousa: Πλίνθιον Plínthion)
 Uzunbayır
 during Ottoman age (1361–1920): Ouzoun-Mpair (Greek: Ουζούν-Μπαΐρ Ouzoún-Mpaḯr; Katharevousa: Οὐζοὺν-Μπαῒρ Ouzoùn-Mpaï̀r)
 during Greek administration (1920–1922): Aniforia (Greek: Ανηφοριά Anīphoriá; Katharevousa: Ἀνηφοριὰ Anēphorià)
 Vaysal
 during Ottoman age (1361–1920): Vaisal (Greek: Βαΐσαλ Vaḯsal; Katharevousa: Βαΐσαλ Baï̀sal)
 during Greek administration (1920–1922): Visaltai (Greek: Βησάλται' Vīsáltai; Katharevousa: Βησάλται' Bēsáltai)
 Yünlüce
 during Ottoman age (1361–1920): Chouloutze (Greek: Χουλουτζέ Chouloutzé; Katharevousa: Χουλουτζὲ Khouloutzè)
 during Greek administration (1920–1922): Chalazio (Greek: Χαλάζιο Chalázio; Katharevousa: Χαλάζιον Khalázion)
 Meriç district: Meriç ilçesi
 Akçadam: Λουλού-κιοϊ
 during Greek administration (1920–1922): Λιλὴ
 Akıncılar: Δραγκὶς
 during Greek administration (1920–1922): Δραγάτσι
 Karahamza: Καράμζα
 during Greek administration (1920–1922): Καρτερία
 Kavaklı: Καβακλῆ
 during Greek administration (1920–1922): Καλύκη
 Olacak: Ὀλατζιὰκ
 during Greek administration (1920–1922): Παρδαλὸς
 Paşayenice: Πασᾶ-Γενιτζὲ
 during Greek administration (1920–1922): Κριθιὰ
 Rahmanca: Ραχμάντζα
 during Greek administration (1920–1922): Ραφάνη
 Saatağacı: Σαὰτ-Ἀγατσῆ
 during Greek administration (1920–1922): Πλάτανος
 Yakupbey: Γιακοὺπ-κιοϊ
 during Greek administration (1920–1922): Σιταριὰ
 Süloğlu district: Süloğlu ilçesi (Greek: επαρχία Ασβεστοχωρίου eparchía Asvestochōríou; Katharevousa: ἐπαρχία Ἀσβεστοχωρίου eparkhía Asbestokhōríou).
 Akardere
 during Ottoman age (1361–1920): Akar-Dere (Greek: Ακάρ-Δερέ Akár-Deré; Katharevousa: Ἀκὰρ-Δερὲ Akàr-Derè)
 during Greek administration (1920–1922): Reumatia (Greek: Ρευματιά Refmatià; Katharevousa: Ρευματιὰ Reumatià)
 Büyükgerdelli
 during Ottoman age (1361–1920): Mega Gkerdeli (Greek: Μέγα Γκερδελή Méga Gkerdelī́; Katharevousa: Μέγα Γκερδελῆ Méga Gkerdelē̂)
 during Greek administration (1920–1922): Megalochori (Greek: Μεγαλοχώρι Megalochṓri; Katharevousa: Μεγαλοχῶρι Megalokhō̂ri)
 Domurcalı
 during Ottoman age (1361–1920): Domourtzali (Greek: Δομουρτζαλή Domourtzalī́; Katharevousa: Δομουρτζαλῆ Domourtzalē̂)
 during Greek administration (1920–1922): Voliko (Greek: Βολικό Volikó; Katharevousa: Βολικὸν Bolikòn)
 Geçkinli
 during Ottoman age (1361–1920): Ketskenli (Greek: Κετσκενλή Ketskenlī́; Katharevousa: Κετσκενλῆ Ketskenlē̂)
 during Greek administration (1920–1922): Palaio (Greek: Παλαιό Palaió; Katharevousa: Παλαιὸν Palaiòn)
 Keramettin
 during Ottoman age (1361–1920): Keramedin (Greek: Κεραμεδίν Keramedín; Katharevousa: Κεραμεδὶν Keramedìn)
 during Greek administration (1920–1922): Kemidrio (Greek: Κεμίδριο Kemídrio; Katharevousa: Κεμίδριον Kemídrion)
 Küküler
 during Ottoman age (1361–1920): Kioukiler (Greek: Κιουκιλέρ Kioukilér; Katharevousa: Κιουκιλὲρ Kioukilèr)
 during Greek administration (1920–1922): Riziko (Greek: Ριζικό Rizikó; Katharevousa: Ριζικὸν Rizikòn)
 Sülecik
 during Ottoman age (1361–1920): Soule-kioi (Greek and Katharevousa: Σουλέ-κιοϊ Soulé-kioï)
 during Greek administration (1920–1922): Kalathochori (Greek: Καλαθοχώρι Kalathochṓri; Katharevousa: Καλαθοχώριον Kalathochṓrion)
 Süloğlu
 during Ottoman age (1361–1920): Soule-Oglou (Greek: Σουλέ-Ογλού Soulé-Ogloú; Katharevousa: Σουλὲ-Ὀγλοῦ Soulè-Ogloū̂)
 during Greek administration (1920–1922): Asvestochori (Greek: Ασβεστοχώρι Asvestochṓri; Katharevousa: Ἀσβεστοχῶρι Asbestokhō̂ri)
 Taşlısekban
 during Ottoman age (1361–1920): Tasli-Sigmpan (Greek: Τασλή-Σιγμπάν Taslī́-Sigmpán; Katharevousa: Τασλῆ-Σιγμπὰν Taslē̂-Sigmpàn)
 during Greek administration (1920–1922): Stratolithos (Greek and Katharevousa: Στρατόλιθος Stratólithos)
 Tatarlar
 during Ottoman age (1361–1920): Tatarlar (Greek: Ταταρλάρ Tatarlár; Katharevousa: Ταταρλὰρ Tatarlàr)
 during Greek administration (1920–1922): Pezoporos (Greek and Katharevousa: Πεζοπόρος Pezopóros)
 Yağcılı
 during Ottoman age (1361–1920): Giagtzili (Greek: Γιαγτζηλή Giagtzīlī́; Katharevousa: Γιαγτζηλῆ Giagtzēlē̂)
 during Greek administration (1920–1922): Theofilochori (Greek: Θεοφιλοχώρι Theophilochṓri; Katharevousa: Θεοφιλοχῶρι Theophilokhō̂ri)
 Uzunköprü district: Uzunköprü ilçesi
 Altınyazı: Χαραλὰ-Γκιουνὲ
 during Greek administration (1920–1922): Γαρέλλα
 Aslıhan: Ἀσλαχὰν
 during Greek administration (1920–1922): Λεοντάριον
 Başağıl: Μάνδρα
 Bayramlı: Τύρναβον
 during Greek administration (1920–1922): Ταυρόκωμον
 Beykonağı: Παλάτι or Μπέη Κονὰκ
 during Greek administration (1920–1922): Διλιανὸν
 Bıldır: Μπιλδὴρ-κιοϊ
 during Greek administration (1920–1922): Πρῖνος
 Çakmakköy: Τσακμάκ
 during Greek administration (1920–1922): Τσακμάκι
 Çalıköy: Τσιαλῆ-κιοϊ
 during Greek administration (1920–1922): Παληοῦρι
 Çiftlikköy: Τσιφλὶκ-κιοϊ
 during Greek administration (1920–1922): Τσιφλικάκι
 Çobanpınarı: Τσιομπὰν-Μπουνὰρ
 during Greek administration (1920–1922): Στάνη
 Çöpköy: Τσιόπ-κιοϊ
 during Greek administration (1920–1922): Γεωργιούπολις
 Değirmenci: Δεϊρμεντζῆ-κιοϊ
 during Greek administration (1920–1922): Μυλωνάδες
 Dereköy: Δερέ-κιοϊ
 during Greek administration (1920–1922): Μοναστηράκιον
 Elmalı: Ἐρμενί-κιοϊ
 during Greek administration (1920–1922): Ἄρμενα
 Hamidiye: Χαμηδιὲ
 during Greek administration (1920–1922): Χορταριὰ
 Hamitli: Χιμιτλῆ
 during Greek administration (1920–1922): Χυμὸς
 Harmanlı: Χαρμανλῆ
 during Greek administration (1920–1922): Ἁλωνάκι
 Hasanpınar: Χασὰν-Μπουνὰρ
 during Greek administration (1920–1922): Πηγάδια
 Kadıağılı: Καδῆ-Γκαλᾶ
 during Greek administration (1920–1922): Κατύχαλα
 Kadıköy: Βέργη or Καδήκιοϊ
 during Greek administration (1920–1922): Εἰρηνικὸν
 Karapınar: Καρᾶ-Μπουνὰρ
 during Greek administration (1920–1922): Μαυροπήγαδον
 Karayayla: Καραγιαϊλὰ
 during Greek administration (1920–1922): Καρέγλη
 Kavacık: Καβατζὴκ
 during Greek administration (1920–1922):Μαγούλα
 Kırcasalih: Ζαλοὺφ
 during Greek administration (1920–1922): Ζαλούφιον
 Kırkkavak: Κίρκ-Καβὰκ
 during Greek administration (1920–1922): Λεῦκες
 Kırköy: Κίρ-κιοϊ
 during Greek administration (1920–1922): Ἀμυγδαλιὰ
 Kurdu: Κουρδὶ
 during Greek administration (1920–1922): Δανιήλειον
 Kurtbey: Κοὺρτ-Μπέη
 during Greek administration (1920–1922): Γάζα
 Kurttepe: Κοὺρτ-Τεπὲ
 during Greek administration (1920–1922): Λυκοβούνιον
 Malkoçköy: Μαλκὸτς
 during Greek administration (1920–1922): Γραβιὰ
 Meşeli: Μεσελῆ
 during Greek administration (1920–1922): Δρῦς
 Muhacirkadı: Μουχατζὶκ or Καδήκιοϊ
 during Greek administration (1920–1922): Καρυὰ
 Ömerbey: Ὀμὲρ Μπέη
 during Greek administration (1920–1922): Κεφαλάρι
 Övenler: Τσόγγαρα
 during Greek administration (1920–1922): Μένθη
 Saçlımüsellim: Σατσλῆ-Μουσελὴμ
 during Greek administration (1920–1922): Καλαμωτὴ
 Salarlı: Παλάτια or Σαλαρλῆ
 during Greek administration (1920–1922): Σαλαρὴ
 Sazlımalkoç: Σαζλῆ-Μαλκὸτς
 during Greek administration (1920–1922): Καλαμάτα
 Sığırcılı: Σιγιρτζιλῆ
 during Greek administration (1920–1922): Μέλισσα
 Sultanşah: Σουλτὰν-Σιὰχ
 during Greek administration (1920–1922): Βασιλικὰ
 Süleymaniye: Τσιγγενὲ-Μερασὶ
 during Greek administration (1920–1922): Μοιρασιὰ
 Turnacı: Τούρνατζη
 during Greek administration (1920–1922): Γεράνιον
 Uzunköprü: Οὐζοὺν-Κιοπροῦ
 during Greek administration (1920–1922): Μακρὰ Γέφυρα
 Yağmurca: Κεξαμπὸλ
 during Greek administration (1920–1922): Καστανιὰ
 Yeniköy: Γενῆ-κιοϊ
 during Greek administration (1920–1922): ΝεοχῶριKırklareli Province: Kırklareli ili

 Babaeski district: Babaeski ilçesi
 Ağayeri: Ἀγᾶ-Γερῆ
 during Greek administration (1920–1922): Γερῆ
 Alpullu: Ἄλπολου
 during Greek administration (1920–1922): Ἀλόπη
 Babaeski: Ἐλευθεραὶ or Μπαμπᾶ Ἐσκῆ
 during Greek administration (1920–1922): Ἀρτισκὸς
 Büyük Mandıra: Μάνδρα.
 Çavuşköy: Τσαούς-κιοϊ
 during Greek administration (1920–1922): Μανούσιον
 Çengerli: Τσεγγερλῆ
 during Greek administration (1920–1922): Ἀγγελῆ
 Çiğdemli: Τσιφιλῆ
 during Greek administration (1920–1922): Φυλὴ
 Düğüncülü: Δογάντζαλη
 during Greek administration (1920–1922): Διοβούνιον
 Erikleryurdu: Ἐρεκλὲρ-Γιορντοῦ
 during Greek administration (1920–1922): Ἐρικιὰ
 Hazinedar: Χαζνατὰρ
 during Greek administration (1920–1922): Χαρμιόνη
 Kadıköy: Καδῆ-κιοϊ
 during Greek administration (1920–1922): Κάδη
 Karabayır: Καρᾶ-Μπαῒρ
 during Greek administration (1920–1922): Μαυροβούνιον
 Karacaoğlan: Καρατζασλὰν
 during Greek administration (1920–1922): Καραβιὰ
 Katranca: Κατράντζα
 during Greek administration (1920–1922): Κατράνη
 Kuleli: Κούλελι
 during Greek administration (1920–1922): Νίκισσα
 Kumrular: Κομρουλὰρ
 during Greek administration (1920–1922): Περιστέριον
 Kuzuçardağı: Κουζοῦ-Τσαρδὰκ
 during Greek administration (1920–1922): Καψάλα
 Minnetler: Μινετλὲρ
 during Greek administration (1920–1922): Μελικὴ
 Müsellim: Μουσελὴμ
 during Greek administration (1920–1922): Μουσοχώριον
 Nacak: Νατζὰκ
 during Greek administration (1920–1922): Νασάκιον
 Nadırlı: Ναδιρλῆ
 during Greek administration (1920–1922): Καλλονὴ
 Sinanlı: Συνανλῆ
 during Greek administration (1920–1922): Σινάλη
 Sofuhalil: Σοφοῦ-Χαλὴλ
 during Greek administration (1920–1922): Σοφοῦ
 Taşağıl: Τὰς-Ἀγὴλ
 during Greek administration (1920–1922): Ἄσυλον
 Taşköprü: Τὰς-Κιοπροῦ
 during Greek administration (1920–1922): Τάσσος
 Terzili: Τερζιλῆ
 during Greek administration (1920–1922): Τερσηνὴ
 Yeniköy: Γενῆ-κιοϊ
 during Greek administration (1920–1922): Ἀέτιον
 Yenimahalle: Γενῆ-Μαχαλὲ
 during Greek administration (1920–1922): Βαθύλειμον
 Lüleburgaz district: Lüleburgaz ilçesi
 Ahmetbey: Ἀχμὲτ-Βέη
 during Greek administration (1920–1922): Στρατηγεῖον
 Akçaköy: Ἀκτσέ-κιοϊ
 during Greek administration (1920–1922): Ἀσβέστη
 Ayvalı: Ἀϊβαλῆ
 during Greek administration (1920–1922): Κύδωνες
 Büyükkarıştıran: Μέγα Καρυστιρὰν
 during Greek administration (1920–1922): Μεγάλη Δριζυπάρα
 Celaliye: Γιουβάν-κιοϊ
 during Greek administration (1920–1922): Γιάννινα
 Çengelli: Τσεγκλερλῆ
 during Greek administration (1920–1922): Ἀγγίστριον
 Çeşmekolu: Τσεσμὲ-Κολοῦ
 during Greek administration (1920–1922): Κολλίνα
 Çiftlikköy: Τσιφλὶκ-κιοϊ
 during Greek administration (1920–1922): Βερωνὴ
 Davutlu: Δαουτλοῦ
 during Greek administration (1920–1922): Δαυλὸς
 Emirali: Ἐμὶρ-Ἀλῆ or Ἰμραλῆ
 during Greek administration (1920–1922): Δασοχώριον
 Evrensekiz: Ἐβρὲν-Σεκὴζ
 during Greek administration (1920–1922): Ἰτέα
 Karaağaç: Καραγὰτς
 during Greek administration (1920–1922): Καραγὸς
 Karamusul: Καρᾶ-Μουσοὺλ
 during Greek administration (1920–1922): Μαυρόγεια
 Kayabeyli: Καλιᾶ-Μπεϊλῆ or Καϊμπελῆ
 during Greek administration (1920–1922): Καψάμπελα
 Kırıkköy: Κιρὶκ-Μουσᾶ or Κρίκιοϊ
 during Greek administration (1920–1922): Κοντάδεστος
 Küçükkarıştıran: Μικρὸ Καρυστιρὰν
 during Greek administration (1920–1922): Μικρὰ Δριζυπάρα
 Lüleburgaz: Ἀρκαδιούπολης.
 Müsellim: Μουσελὴμ
 during Greek administration (1920–1922): Καταφυλὴ
 Oklalı: Ὀκλακλῆ
 during Greek administration (1920–1922): Ὀκλάδες
 Ovacık: Κούμσαϊκ
 during Greek administration (1920–1922): Σαΐττα
 Seyitler: Σεϊτλὲρ
 during Greek administration (1920–1922): Μαρτύριον
 Tatarköy: Τατὰρ-κιοϊ
 during Greek administration (1920–1922): Ξάνθος
 Turgutbey: Τοὺρ-Βέη
 during Greek administration (1920–1922): Τέαρος
 Umurca: Ὀμούρτζα
 during Greek administration (1920–1922): Μύριννα
 Pehlivanköy district: Pehlivanköy ilçesi
 Doğanca: Δογάντζα
 during Greek administration (1920–1922): Δογάδες
 İmampazarı: Ἰμὰμ-Παζὰρ
 during Greek administration (1920–1922): Ἀμάδες
 Kuştepe: Κοὺς-τεπὲ
 during Greek administration (1920–1922): Ἀκουστὴ
 Pehlivanköy: Παυλῆ-κιοϊ
 during Greek administration (1920–1922): Παυλοχώριον
 Yeşilova: Μπουρουνσοὺζ
 during Greek administration (1920–1922): Πουρναριὰ
 Yeşilpınar: Τιλκῆ-Μπουνὰρ
 during Greek administration (1920–1922): Τελικὴ
 Pınarhisar district: Pınarhisar ilçesi
 Kurudere: Κουροῦ-Δερὲ
 during Greek administration (1920–1922): ΚουρούναTekirdağ Province: Tekirdağ ili (Greek: νομός Ραιδεστού nomós Raidestoú; Katharevousa: νομὸς Ραιδεστοῦ nomòs Raidestoū̂).

 Çerkezköy district: Çerkezköy ilçesi
 Bahçeağıl: Μπαχτσὲ-Ἀγὴλ
 during Greek administration (1920–1922): Ἄζηλον
 Çerkezköy: Τσερκέζ-κιοϊ
 during Greek administration (1920–1922): Κουπέριον
 Kapaklı: Καπακλῆ-Μπουνὰρ
 during Greek administration (1920–1922): Κανάλιον
 Karaağaç: Καρᾶ-Ἀγὰτς
 during Greek administration (1920–1922): Καραβᾶς
 Karlı: Καρλῆ-κιοϊ
 during Greek administration (1920–1922): Κοράλλιον
 Kızılpınar: Κιζὴλ-Μπουνὰρ
 during Greek administration (1920–1922): Πηγαὶ
 Pınarca: Μπουνάρτζα
 during Greek administration (1920–1922): Ἀνάργια
 Uzunhacı: Οὐζοὺν-Χατζῆ
 during Greek administration (1920–1922): Ὀζόνη
 Yanıkağıl: Γιαννὴκ-Ἀγὶλ
 during Greek administration (1920–1922): Ἀργίλη
 Çorlu district: Çorlu ilçesi
 Ahimehmet: Ἀχήρ-κιοϊ
 during Greek administration (1920–1922): Ἄχυρα
 Misinli: Μουσινλῆ
 during Greek administration (1920–1922): Μεσσήνη
 Paşaköy: Πασᾶ-κιοϊ
 during Greek administration (1920–1922): Κρυφονέριον
 Saray district: Saray ilçesi
 Ayvacık: Αϊβατζὴκ
 during Greek administration (1920–1922): Ἀήττητον
 Bahçedere: Μπαχτσὲ-Δερὲ
 during Greek administration (1920–1922): Δάρα
 Büyükyoncalı: Μπουγιοὺκ-Μανίκα
 during Greek administration (1920–1922): Μεγάλη Μανούκα
 Çayla: Τσαϊλὰ
 during Greek administration (1920–1922): Καήλα
 Çukuryurt: Τσιουκοὺρ-Γιοὺρτ
 during Greek administration (1920–1922): Ζακούριον
 Demirler: Δεμιρλὲρ
 during Greek administration (1920–1922): Δημούλη
 Edirköy: Ἐδίρ-κιοϊ
 during Greek administration (1920–1922): Δίρκη
 Göçerler: Γκιουρτζελὲρ
 during Greek administration (1920–1922): Σφύρα
 Güngörmez: Γκιοὺν-Γκιορμὲζ
 during Greek administration (1920–1922): Ἀνήλιον
 Kadıköy: Καδήκιοϊ
 during Greek administration (1920–1922): Καλὴ
 Karabürçek: Καρᾶ-Μπεζλὲκ
 during Greek administration (1920–1922): Διάβα
 Kavacık: Καβατζὶκ
 during Greek administration (1920–1922): Λεύκη
 Küçükyoncalı: Κιουτσοὺκ-Μανίκα
 during Greek administration (1920–1922): Μικρὰ Μανούκα
 Osmanlı: Ὀσμανλῆ
 during Greek administration (1920–1922): Ὁμαλὴ
 Sefaalan: Σεφὰ-Ἀλὰν
 during Greek administration (1920–1922): Σέφαλος
 Sinanlı: Συνανλῆ
 during Greek administration (1920–1922): Σινᾶς
 Sofular: Σοφουλὰρ-Σεχρᾶ
 during Greek administration (1920–1922): Ζαφύριον
 Yuvalı: Γουβαλὴ
 during Greek administration (1920–1922): Καλημέριον
 Şarköy district: Şarköy ilçesi (Greek: επαρχία Περιστάσεως eparchía Peristáseōs; Katharevousa: ἐπαρχία Περιστάσεως eparkhía Peristáseōs).
 Bulgur
 during Ottoman age (1362-1920) Mpoulgouri (Greek: Μπουλγούρη Mpolgoúrī; Katharevousa: Μπουλγούρη Mpoulgoúrē)
 during Greek administration (1920–1922): Polydori (Greek: Πολυδώρη Polydṓrī Katharevousa: Πολυδώρη Poludṓrē)
 Çengelli
 during Ottoman age (1362-1920) Tsigkirli (Greek: Τσιγκιρλή Tsigkirlī́; Katharevousa: Τσιγκιρλῆ Tsigkirlē̂)
 during Greek administration (1920–1922): Chalkanthi (Greek: Χαλκάνθη Chalkánthī Katharevousa: Χαλκάνθη Khalkánthē)
 Eriklice
 during Ancient, Roman and Byzantine era (...-1362) Herakleia Peristaseos (Ancient Greek: Ηράκλεια Περιστάσεως Hērákleia Peristáseōs; Latin: Heraclea Peristasis) during Ottoman age (1362-1920) Heracleitsa (Greek: Ηρακλείτσα Īrakleítsa; Katharevousa: Ἡρακλείτσα Hērakleítsa)
 during Greek administration (1920–1922): Herakleitsa Peristaseos (Greek: Ηρακλείτσα Περιστάσεως Īrakleítsa Peristáseōs; Katharevousa: Ἡρακλείτσα Περιστάσεως Hērakleítsa Peristáseōs)
 İshaklı
 during Ottoman age (1362-1920) Isaakli (Greek: Ισαακλή Isaaklī́; Katharevousa: Ἰσαακλῆ Isaaklē̂)
 during Greek administration (1920–1922): Agios Ioannis (Greek: Άγιος Ιωάννης Ágios Iōánnīs Katharevousa: Ἅγιος Ἰωάννης Hágios Iōánnēs)
 Kızılcaterzi
 during Ottoman age (1362-1920) Kiziltza-Terzi (Greek: Κιζηλτζά-Τερζή Kizīltzá-Terzī́; Katharevousa: Κιζηλτζᾶ-Τερζῆ Kizēltzā̂-Terzē̂)
 during Greek administration (1920–1922): Trausoi (Greek: Τραυσοί Trafsoí Katharevousa: Τραυσοὶ Trausoì)
 Kocaali
 during Ottoman age (1362-1920) Kotsa-Ali (Greek: Κοτςά-Αλή Kotsá-Alī́; Katharevousa: Κοτςᾶ-Ἀλῆ Kotsā̂-Alē̂)
 during Greek administration (1920–1922): Elpis (Greek: Ελπίς Elpís Katharevousa: Ἐλπὶς Elpìs)
 Palamut
 during Ottoman age (1362-1920) Palamout (Greek and Katharevousa: Παλαμούτ Palamoút)
 during Greek administration (1920–1922): Dryinochori (Greek: Δρυϊνοχώρι Dryïnochṓri; Katharevousa: Δρυϊνοχώριον Druïnokhṓrion)
 Sofuköy
 during Ottoman age (1362-1920) Sofi-kioi (Greek: Σοφί-κιοϊ Sofí-kioï; Katharevousa: Σοφί-κιοϊ Sophí-kioï)
 during Greek administration (1920–1922): Sofiko (Greek: Σοφικό Sofikó Katharevousa: Σοφικὸν Sophikòn)
 Ulaman
 during Ottoman age (1362-1920) Oulaman (Greek: Ουλαμάν Oulamán; Katharevousa: Οὐλαμὰν Oulamàn)
 during Greek administration (1920–1922): Oulamos (Greek: Ουλαμός Oulamós; Katharevousa: Οὐλαμὸς Oulamòs)
 Yayaağaç
 during Ottoman age (1362-1920) Giagiats (Greek: Γιαγιάτς Giagiàtś; Katharevousa: Γιαγιὰτς Giagiàts)
 during Greek administration (1920–1922): Kalodendro (Greek: Καλόδενδρο Kalódendro Katharevousa: Καλόδενδρον Kalódendron)
 Yeniköy
 during Ottoman age (1362-1920) Geni-kioi (Greek: Γενή-κιοϊ Genī́-kioï ; Katharevousa: Γενῆ-κιοϊ Genē̂-kioï)
 during Greek administration (1920–1922): Neochori' (Greek: Νεοχώρι Neochṓri Katharevousa: Νεοχώριον Neokhṓrion'')

Lists of exonyms
Turkey geography-related lists
Exonyms
Greek
Exonyms
Exonyms
Lists of former place names